Notagonum weigeli is a species of ground beetle in the subfamily Platyninae. It was described by Baehr in 2007.

References

Notagonum
Beetles described in 2007